The Old State House is a historic building in Boston, Massachusetts.  Built in 1713, it was the seat of the Massachusetts General Court until 1798. It is located at the intersection of Washington and State streets, and is one of the oldest public buildings in the United States.

One of the landmarks on Boston's Freedom Trail, it is the oldest surviving public building in Boston, and now serves as a history museum that, through 2019, was operated by the Bostonian Society. On January 1, 2020, the Bostonian Society merged with the Old South Association in Boston to form Revolutionary Spaces. The Old State House was designated a National Historic Landmark in 1960 and a Boston Landmark by the Boston Landmarks Commission in 1994.

History

The Massachusetts Town House: seat of colony government 1713–1776 
The previous building, the wooden Town House of 1657, had burned in the fire of 1711.  Today's brick Old State House was built in 1712–13, and possibly designed by Robert Twelves.  Some historians credit Thomas Dawes with being the architect, but he was of a later generation. His contributions probably came in about 1772, after a four-year period of the General Assembly having to meet in Cambridge due to British use of the building as a military barrack (which resulted in considerable damage).  A notable feature was the pair of seven-foot tall wooden figures depicting a lion and unicorn, symbols of the British monarchy. A Royal Coat of Arms was later removed from Council Chambers during the Revolution by Loyalist fleeing the then colony and now located at Trinity Anglican Church in Saint John, New Brunswick since 1791. The coat of arms is now in the nave having survived the fire at Trinity in 1877.

The building housed a Merchant's Exchange on the first floor and warehouses in the basement. On the second floor, the east side contained the Council Chamber of the Royal Governor while the west end of the second floor contained chambers for the Courts of Suffolk County and the Massachusetts Supreme Judicial Court. The central portion contained the chambers for the elected Massachusetts legislature, the General Court. This chamber is notable for including public galleries, the first known example of such a feature being included in a chamber for elected officials in the English-speaking world.

The interior was rebuilt in 1748, after a fire in 1747 (the brick walls of the 1712–13 building survived the fire). NIST researchers have also researched the effects of the Cape Ann earthquake of 1755 on the building's foundation and walls given the age of the structure.

In 1755, Spencer Phips, Lieutenant Governor of the Province of Massachusetts Bay, signed a Proclamation at the Old State House calling on all “settlers” to hunt and murder Penobscot men, women and children in exchange for pay and land. The Proclamation was one of more than 100 government-issued scalp bounties issued in the United States between 1675 and 1885. In 2021, Penobscot Nation leaders and their children visited the Old State House to read the Proclamation out loud, which was featured in the short documentary Bounty.
 
In 1761, James Otis argued against the Writs of Assistance in the Royal Council Chamber. Though he lost the case, Otis influenced public opinion in a way that contributed to the American Revolution; John Adams later wrote of that speech, "Then and there ... the child independence was born."

On March 5, 1770, the Boston Massacre occurred in front of the building on Devonshire Street. Lieutenant Governor Thomas Hutchinson stood on the building's balcony to speak to the people, ordering the crowd to return to their homes.

The Massachusetts State House: seat of state government 1776–1798

On July 18, 1776, the Declaration of Independence was proclaimed from the east side balcony to jubilant crowds by Col. Thomas Crafts (one of the Sons of Liberty). At one o'clock Crafts rose in the Council Chamber and read it to the members. Then, fellow patriot Sheriff William Greenleaf attempted to read it from the balcony, but he could only muster a whisper. Crafts then stood next to the sheriff and read it from the balcony in a stentorian tone. For most people, it was a festive occasion, as about two-thirds of Boston residents supported the revolution. The lion and the unicorn on top of the building were removed and burned in a bonfire on King Street.

After the American Revolution, the building served as the seat of the Massachusetts state government before its move to the present Massachusetts State House in 1798.

Boston hall 
From 1830 to 1841, the building was Boston's city hall. Previously, the city's offices had been in the County Court House.  In 1830, Isaiah Rogers altered the building's interior in a Greek Revival style, most notably adding the spiral staircase that remains today. The building was damaged by fire in 1832.

During this period of time, City Hall shared the building with the Boston Post Office and several private businesses. On October 21, 1835, Mayor Theodore Lyman, Jr. gave temporary refuge to William Lloyd Garrison, the editor of the abolitionist paper The Liberator, who was being chased by a violent mob. Garrison was kept safe in the Old State House until being driven to the Leverett Street Jail, where he was protected overnight but charged with inciting a riot. In 1841, City Hall moved to the former Suffolk County Courthouse, on School Street.

Period of commercial use 1841–1881 
After Boston's city hall left, the whole building was rented out for commercial use. This had been the case once before, in the interim between the State House period and the City Hall period. Occupants included tailors, clothing merchants, insurance agents, railroad line offices, and more. As many as fifty businesses used the building at once.

The Bostonian Society and the museum 1881–2019 
In 1881, in response to plans for the possible demolition of the building due to real estate potential, The Bostonian Society was formed to preserve and steward the Old State House. In 1881–1882, restorations were conducted by George A. Clough. In 1882, replicas of the lion and unicorn statues were placed atop the East side of the building, after the originals that had been burned in 1776. On the West side, the building sports a statue of an eagle, in recognition of the Old State House's connection to American history.

Since 1904, the State Street MBTA station has occupied part of the building's basement. The East Boston Tunnel, which is now the Blue Line, opened in 1904, and the Washington Street Tunnel, a part of the Orange Line, opened in 1908. The Boston Marine Museum occupied rooms borrowed from the Bostonian Society, 1909–1947.

On July 11, 1976, as part of her Boston visit to celebrate the bicentenary of the United States of America, Queen Elizabeth II toured the Old State House with her husband.  She appeared on the historic balcony and delivered an address to a large audience. The Queen said, in part,

The museum today

Today, tall buildings of Boston's financial district surround the Old State House. However, they do not entirely block the view of the building, and it can be seen clearly from a good distance away on the harborfront. The Old State House sits atop the State Street station on the MBTA's Blue and Orange subway lines, and the station can be entered from the basement. The building is available for private events. The museum is open year-round, seven days a week except for some holidays.

The next stop on Freedom Trail is the site of the Boston Massacre, located on a busy street in front of the museum, which is now commemorated by a cobblestone ring on the newly rebuilt plaza in front of the Old State House. The museum offers an array of programming and exhibitions, some tied to the Boston Massacre.

Recent preservation and restoration and future plans 
The Old State House frequently has preservation and restoration projects as a part of the ongoing effort to keep the building in good condition.

In 2006, the museum underwent a restoration to repair water-damaged masonry. The damage had long been a problem, but was aggravated in fall 2005 by Hurricane Wilma. The project was the subject of an episode of The History Channel's Save Our History.

In 2008, the museum's tower was given a major restoration. During the project, the building's 1713 weathervane, which may have been made by Shem Drowne, was re-gilded. The windows were repaired and resealed, the balustrades were repaired, and the copper roofing and rotten wood siding was replaced. This was done to prevent structural damage and to protect the museum's collections and the 1831 clock by Simon Willard below.

Revolutionary Spaces is in the planning stages of several changes to increase accessibility to the museum. Historical buildings pose many challenges to accessibility for visitors who cannot use stairs, but the museum plans to use new technologies to solve this problem and add a ramp and wheelchair lift.

Replicas
 Brockton Fairgrounds, Brockton, MA
 Curry College, Milton, MA; Traditional residence, North Side
 Eastern States Exposition ("The Big E"), West Springfield, MA; Avenue of States section
 Jamestown, Virginia Expo. of 1907, State buildings section
 Weymouth Civic District, Weymouth, MA town hall

Gallery

See also
List of National Historic Landmarks in Boston
National Register of Historic Places listings in northern Boston, Massachusetts
List of members of the colonial Massachusetts House of Representatives

References

External links

 Boston Historical Society - Old State House
 Boston National Historical Park Official Website
 Freedom Trail Foundation (Official website of the Freedom Trail)
City of Boston, Boston Landmarks CommissionOld State House Study Report

Government buildings completed in 1713
Government buildings in Boston
Landmarks in Financial District, Boston
Museums in Boston
National Historic Landmarks in Boston
Massachusetts
Massachusetts General Court
History museums in Massachusetts
Government buildings on the National Register of Historic Places in Massachusetts
Boston National Historical Park
1713 establishments in Massachusetts
Government Houses of the British Empire and Commonwealth
National Register of Historic Places in Boston